Habel Boas Inzaghi Isir (born 24 June 1999) is an Indonesian professional footballer who plays as a centre back for Liga 1 club Nusantara United.

Club career

Perseru Serui
In 2018, Isir signed a year contract with Perseru Serui. He made his league debut on 29 April 2018 in a match against PSIS Semarang. On 9 September 2018, Isir scored his first goal for Perseru against Persipura Jayapura in the 11th minute at the Mandala Stadium, Jayapura.

Persewar Waropen
Boas Isir joined the Persewar Waropen club in the 2019 Liga 2.

Kalteng Putra
He was signed for Kalteng Putra to play in Liga 2 in the 2020 season. This season was suspended on 27 March 2020 due to the COVID-19 pandemic. The season was abandoned and was declared void on 20 January 2021.

RANS Cilegon
In 2021, Boas Isir signed a contract with Indonesian Liga 2 club RANS Cilegon. He made his league debut on 2 November 2021 in a match against Dewa United at the Gelora Bung Karno Madya Stadium, Jakarta.

Career statistics

Club

Honours

Club
RANS Cilegon
 Liga 2 runner-up: 2021

References

External links 
 Boas Isir at Soccerway
 Boas Isir at Liga Indonesia

1999 births
Living people
Indonesian Christians
Indonesian footballers
Liga 2 (Indonesia) players
Liga 1 (Indonesia) players
Association football defenders
Perseru Serui players
Persewar Waropen players
Kalteng Putra F.C. players
RANS Nusantara F.C. players
People from Jayapura
Sportspeople from Papua